Donald William Gotterbarn is a computer ethics researcher.  Gotterbarn received his Ph.D. in Philosophy in 1971 from the University of Rochester.  He also earned his M. Div. from the Colgate Rochester Divinity School.

Professional career
Gotterbarn is an author of the Software Engineering Code of Ethics and Professional Practice which promotes ethics among software engineers.  He is the chair of the Association for Computing Machinery Committee on Professional Ethics.

Gotterbarn is a Professor Emeritus at East Tennessee State University in Johnson City, TN.

Awards
 ACM SIGCAS Making a Difference Award, 2002
 For research and work regarding computer and software engineering ethics.
 Outstanding Contribution to the ACM Award, 2005
 "for exceptional accomplishments and leadership as both an educator and practitioner, in establishing the ACM's Codes of Ethics and promoting the ethical behavior of computing professionals and organizations."
 Weizenbaum Award, 2010
 "for his role in developing the moral consciousness of the profession."

See also
Computer ethics

References

External links
Donald Gotterbarn's personal web site

University of Rochester alumni
Year of birth missing (living people)
East Tennessee State University faculty
Living people
Colgate Rochester Crozer Divinity School alumni